The Netherlands was represented by Saskia and Serge, with the song "Tijd", at the 1971 Eurovision Song Contest, which took place on 3 April in Dublin. The song was the winner of the Dutch national final for the contest, held on 24 February. Saskia and Serge were selected internally by broadcaster NOS as the 1971 performers; it is widely thought that this was done in response to the 1970 preselection in which the couple's song "Spinnewiel" was placed runner-up by the juries despite being the overwhelming favourite of the Dutch public.

Before Eurovision

Nationaal Songfestival 1971 
The national final was held on 24 February 1971 at the NOS studios in Hilversum, hosted by Willy Dobbe. Saskia and Serge performed six songs and the winner was chosen by postcard voting; again it is believed that this method was employed so that there could be no complaints that the public's choice had been overruled by a handful of jury members.

At Eurovision 
On the night of the final Saskia and Serge performed 14th in the running order, following Ireland and preceding Portugal. Saskia's performance was hampered by a microphone problem on the opening lines of the song, where her voice was inaudible and the audience and TV viewers heard loud audio feedback. At the close of voting "Tijd" had received 85 points, placing the Netherlands joint 6th (with Sweden) of the 18 entries.

The Dutch conductor at the contest was Dolf van der Linden for the 13th and last time (in total, he conducted 18 songs, including few entries from other countries that did not send their own conductors in the contests hosted by the Netherlands).

References

External links 
 Dutch Preselection 1971

1971
Countries in the Eurovision Song Contest 1971
Eurovision